Bjelland is a former municipality in Vest-Agder county, Norway.  The  municipality from 1902 until 1964 when it was merged into Marnardal municipality. It is now located in the northern part of the present-day municipality of Lindesnes.  The administrative centre of the municipality was the village of Bjelland where Bjelland Church is located.

History
The municipality of Bjelland was created on 1 January 1902 when the old municipality of Bjelland og Grindum was split into Bjelland (population: 907) and Grindheim (population: 909).  During the 1960s, there were many municipal mergers across Norway due to the work of the Schei Committee.  On 1 January 1964, Bjelland municipality was dissolved.  The majority of Bjelland (population: 535) was merged with the municipalities of Laudal, Øyslebø, and a small part of Finsland to create the new municipality of Marnardal. At the same time, the Ågedal and Midtbø area of Bjelland (population: 96) was transferred to the municipality of Audnedal.

Government
All municipalities in Norway, including Bjelland, are responsible for primary education (through 10th grade), outpatient health services, senior citizen services, unemployment and other social services, zoning, economic development, and municipal roads.  The municipality was governed by a municipal council of elected representatives, which in turn elected a mayor.

Municipal council
The municipal council  of Bjelland was made up of representatives that were elected to four year terms.  The party breakdown of the final municipal council was as follows:

See also
List of former municipalities of Norway

References

Audnedal
Marnardal
Former municipalities of Norway
1902 establishments in Norway
1964 disestablishments in Norway